RMS Aurania was a British Ocean Liner that was scrapped at Genoa, Italy after 22 years of service (1883-1905).

Construction 
Aurania was constructed in 1881 at the J. & G. Thomson & Co. shipyard in Glasgow, United Kingdom for Cunard Line. She was completed in 1883 and made her first voyage on 23 June 1883 from Liverpool to Queenstown to New York. She was named Aurania and served from 1883 to 1905.
She had a Compound engine with 3 inverted cylinders driving a single screw propeller and 3 Masts. The engine was rated at 1500 nhp. She had a steel hull, and eleven watertight compartments of which she could float with two of these flooded.

Career 
In her career Aurania was never very popular, she was known as a badly rolling ship. During her maiden voyage on 23 June 1883 she left Liverpool for Queenstown and finally for New York, but halfway through the Atlantic her engine failed due to overheating, and a broken connecting rod shot through her engine skylight, causing panic among passengers. The voyage was completed under sail and she arrived in New York on 4 July 1883 under sail and tow with disabled engines.

In September 1885, the White Star Liner Republic collided with Aurania off Sandy Hook. Republic was disabled and brought back to New York while Aurania continued her voyage.

In 1900 Aurania was used as a Transport Ship during the Boer war, she returned to civil service in 1903. In 1903 her sailing route was changed and she sailed from the Mediterranean to New York. In 1904 she returned to her original sailing route.

The Final Days 
RMS Aurania was scrapped in Genoa, Italy on 13 March 1905.

References

External links

 

Ships of the Cunard Line
Passenger ships of the United Kingdom
Steamships of the United Kingdom
Ships built on the River Clyde
1882 ships